Jimmy Mazzy is a traditional jazz banjo player and vocalist.

According to jazz writer Scott Yanow, he "has been a popular attraction in the trad jazz circuit since the late '70s." He has performed extensively in the United States and worldwide, appearing at jazz festivals across the country including the Sacramento, San Diego, Essex, and several Connecticut festivals. He is a member of The Paramount Jazz Band and the Wolverine Jazz band and also freelances with other groups including the Yankee Rhythm Kings, the Magnolia Jazz Five, and the Back Bay Ramblers.

In 2002, he was voted the No. 1 traditional jazz banjoist, and No. 2 male singer in the Jazzology and Mississippi Rag readership polls. Mazzy has performed regularly with Jeff Hughes, John Clark, Stan McDonald, Ross Petot and many other traditional jazz musicians.  In 2019, Jimmy Mazzy was inducted into the American Banjo Museum's Hall of Fame, in the category of 4 String Banjo Performance.

See also 
List of banjo players

References

External links
Official Website
Jimmy Mazzy and Friends
Jimmy Mazzy on YouTube

Year of birth missing (living people)
Living people
American jazz banjoists
Jazz banjoists
Stomp Off artists